Orion's Belt is a group of three bright stars in a row in the constellation Orion.

Orion's Belt or the Belt of Orion may also refer to:

Orion's Belt (novel), a 1977 novel
Orion's Belt (film), a 1985 film based on the novel
Belt of Orion Award, an award for excellence of the Air Cadet League of Canada
Orion OB1a or Belt of Orion OB association
Orion's Belt, the collar of the cat Orion in the film Men in Black
"Orion's Belt", a song by Kitty Pryde from the 2012 EP Haha, I'm Sorry

See also
Orion (disambiguation)